Ronald Verch (born 10 February 1986) is a German sprint canoeist who has been competing since the late 2000s. He won a complete set of medals at the ICF Canoe Sprint World Championships with a gold in the C-1 5000 m (2010), a silver in the C-4 1000 m (2009), and a bronze in the C-4 1000 m (2010).

External links
Canoe09.ca profile 

1986 births
German male canoeists
Living people
ICF Canoe Sprint World Championships medalists in Canadian